Culex (Culex) mimulus is a species of mosquito belonging to the genus Culex. It is found in Australia, Bangladesh, Cambodia, China, Hong Kong, India, Indonesia, Malaysia, Myanmar, Nepal, New Guinea (Island); Papua New Guinea, Pakistan, Philippines, Singapore, Sri Lanka, Thailand, Taiwan and Vietnam. Larvae can be found from agro wells and adults are malaria vectors.

References

External links 
Culex mimulus (mosquito)

mimulus
Insects described in 1915